is a Japanese retired footballer.

He signed for Albirex Niigata (S) after graduating from University of Tsukuba.

Club career statistics
As of Jan 2, 2017

References

External links

1995 births
Living people
Japanese footballers
Singapore Premier League players
Albirex Niigata Singapore FC players
Tokyo United FC players
Association football forwards